Andrea Jory (born 25 May 1953) is an Italian bobsledder. He competed in the two man and the four man events at the 1980 Winter Olympics.

References

External links
 

1953 births
Living people
Italian male bobsledders
Olympic bobsledders of Italy
Bobsledders at the 1980 Winter Olympics
Place of birth missing (living people)